Far Away in America is a song sung by the players of the Germany national football team featuring the American disco group Village People. It was the German team song for the 1994 FIFA World Cup that took place in the United States. They performed it on the TV show Wetten, dass..? in Hanover on May 28, 1994. The song peaked at number 44 in the German music chart in July 1994.

Sources 
 Article about Far Away in America on BR online (German)
 Far Away in America on swisscharts.com

1994 singles
Village People songs
Football songs and chants
Songs written by Ralph Siegel
Songs written by Bernd Meinunger
1994 songs
Ariola Records singles